Henrietta is a rural locality in the local government area of Waratah-Wynyard in the North West region of Tasmania.
The 2016 census determined a population of 132 for the state suburb of Henrietta.

History
The locality was gazetted in 1966 and re-gazetted with corrections in 1974.

Geography
The Cam River forms the south-eastern and eastern boundaries.

Road infrastructure
The A10 route (Murchison Highway) enters from the north and runs through to the south-west before exiting. Route C106 (East Yolla Road) starts at an intersection with Route A10 and runs south-east, south, east and north before exiting to the north-east. Route C236 starts at an intersection with Route A10 and runs north-west before exiting.

References

Localities of Waratah–Wynyard Council
Towns in Tasmania